Goodenia stobbsiana is a species of flowering plant in the family Goodeniaceae and is endemic to the north-west of Western Australia. It is a sticky, much-branched, perennial subshrub with egg-shaped to lance-shaped leaves with the narrower end towards the base and thyrses of blue flowers.

Description
Flowering mainly occurs from March to October.

Taxonomy and naming
Goodenia stobbsiana was first formally described in 1878 by Ferdinand von Mueller in Fragmenta phytographiae Australiae from specimens collected by John Forrest. The specific epithet (stobbsiana) honours Johns Stobbs (184–1882), a Presbyterian minister who assisted von Mueller.

Distribution
This goodenia grows in stony soil, often in disturbed or burned areas, mainly in the Pilbara region of north-western Australia.

Conservation status
Goodenia stobbsiana is classified as "not threatened" by the Government of Western Australia Department of Parks and Wildlife.

References

stobbsiana
Eudicots of Western Australia
Taxa named by Ferdinand von Mueller
Plants described in 1878